Akinjide Elijah Idowu (born 9 September 1996) is a Nigerian footballer.

Career
Idowu joined United Soccer League side Portland Timbers 2 on 22 January 2016.

In 2018 was a member of lithuanian FK Palanga.

In 2019 he changed team and became a member of FK Atlantas Klaipėda.

References

External links
Timbers 2 Profile

1996 births
Living people
Association football midfielders
Nigerian footballers
Nigerian expatriate footballers
Portland Timbers 2 players
Nigerian expatriate sportspeople in the United States
Expatriate soccer players in the United States
USL Championship players
Nigeria youth international footballers